Ageneiosus is a genus of driftwood catfishes found mostly in South America with one species extending into Central America.

Species
Thirteen species in this genus are recognized:
 Ageneiosus akamai Ribeiro, Rapp Py-Daniel & Walsh, 2017
 Ageneiosus apiaka Ribeiro, Rapp Py-Daniel & Walsh, 2017
 Ageneiosus dentatus Kner, 1857
 Ageneiosus inermis (Linnaeus, 1766) (manduba)
 Ageneiosus intrusus Ribeiro, Rapp Py-Daniel & Walsh, 2017
 Ageneiosus lineatus Ribeiro, Rapp Py-Daniel & Walsh, 2017
 Ageneiosus magoi Castillo G. & Brull G., 1989
 Ageneiosus militaris Valenciennes, 1836
 Ageneiosus pardalis Lütken, 1874
 Ageneiosus polystictus Steindachner, 1915
 Ageneiosus ucayalensis Castelnau, 1855
 Ageneiosus uranophthalmus Ribeiro & Rapp Py-Daniel, 2010
 Ageneiosus vittatus Steindachner, 1908

References

 
Auchenipteridae
Fish of South America
Catfish genera
Taxa named by Bernard Germain de Lacépède